Visalia Transit (VT) is the primary bus agency serving residents and visitors to Visalia, California, the largest city and county seat of Tulare County, California. It is operated by the city through its contractor (First Transit) and offers both fixed routes and dial-a-ride local service within Visalia.

Most routes operate out of the central transit center in Downtown Visalia. There are three secondary hubs located on the city's north, west, and south sides. Buses connecting Visalia's central transit hub to nearby census-designated places are handled by the Tulare County Regional Transit Agency including services to Dinuba (Route C10) and Woodlake (Route C30); Route C40 connects the southern hub in Visalia (Government Center) with Tulare and Porterville.

History 

Public transportation in Visalia was initially provided by the Visalia Electric Railroad, which operated streetcars between 1904 and 1924. Local transit operations were taken over by the city of Visalia in 1981, spurred by growth in the city's size and population. The first routes were spokes radiating from a downtown hub; service expansion since then has included newer developments south and west of the original urban core, and routes to outlying communities such as Exeter, Farmersville, and Goshen.

The Visalia Towne Trolley service, operating a circulation route in downtown Visalia, started in November 1998. The Towne Trolley was discontinued in September 2017 due to low ridership and were made available for charter service, but low use led the City Council to sell four of the five trolleys in January 2019.

Services 
Visalia Transit operates seven days a week, with no service on specific holidays (New Year's Day, Easter, Memorial Day, Independence Day, Thanksgiving, and Christmas) and limited service on other holidays (President's Day, Labor Day, Christmas Eve, and New Year's Eve). The agency serves a population of approximately 138,207 in its  service area.

In addition to its fixed-route and dial-a-ride transportation services within Visalia, the city operates two special long-distance routes (V-LINE to Fresno and Sequoia Shuttle to Sequoia National Park), a free intracity shuttle for at-risk youths (LOOP), and maintains The Greenline, where callers may request information about Visalia Transit and other local agencies within Tulare County. The Greenline call center is staffed Monday through Saturday.

Fixed routes 
Most fixed routes connect to the Visalia Transit Center (VTC) near downtown Visalia; many of these routes connect to secondary hubs on the west (Visalia Medical Clinic), south (Government Center and Sequoia Mall), or north (Orchard Walk/Target Dinuba Road).

Notes

Fares 
Although exact cash fare is required, passes may be purchased at the farebox; change will be provided in the form of a change card, which is valid for one year after it was issued. Visalia offers the Rider Rewards reloadable smart card, available for purchase from the Visalia Transit Center; value may be added to the Rider Rewards card online. Monthly pass users with a Rider Rewards card qualify for discounts from certain local merchants.

Fare collection was temporarily suspended during the COVID-19 pandemic, but has resumed as of February 1, 2021.

Notes

Transfers 
Although Visalia Transit connects with Tulare InterModal Express (TIME), Tulare County Area Transit (TCaT), Greyhound, and Kings Area Regional Transit (KART), transfers are accepted without charge from TCaT connections onto VT Route 1 only.

V-LINE 

Visalia Transit operates the V-LINE commuter service, connecting Visalia with Fresno.

V-LINE buses depart from the Visalia Transit Center and make stops at the Visalia Municipal Airport (main terminal), Fresno Yosemite International Airport, California State University, Fresno (near Maple & Shaw), and Courthouse Park in downtown Fresno, where riders can transfer to Fresno Area Express, Amtrak, and Greyhound Lines, before returning to Visalia. Typical headways on V-LINE range from 120 to 240 minutes. V-LINE is operated seven days a week with the exception of certain holidays (New Year's Day, Easter, Memorial Day, Independence Day, Thanksgiving Day, and Christmas Day). V-LINE passengers may park for free at the Visalia Airport for up to ten days. The route charges a premium fare. , a one-way ride is $10 for the general public and $9 for qualified riders (students, seniors, disabled, and military veterans); multiple-ride "punch passes" are available, bringing per-ride costs down to $7 and $6 (for 40 prepaid rides), respectively.

Sequoia Shuttle 
Visalia Transit operates the seasonal Sequoia Shuttle service, connecting Visalia with Sequoia National Park via Exeter, Three Rivers, and Lemon Cove.

The Sequoia Shuttle takes passengers to the Foothills Visitor Center and Giant Forest Monument in Sequoia National Park, where they may transfer to the park's internal shuttles. Due to the narrow roads to the park, Sequoia Shuttle buses are limited to 16 passengers, and reservations must be booked no later than 5 AM the day of travel as a result. The fare for Sequoia Shuttle is $20 for a round-trip, as approved by the Visalia City Council in 2019; it was the first fare increase since it was raised to $15 in 2008. The shuttles were canceled for the 2020 and 2021 seasons because of the ongoing COVID-19 pandemic in California.

Fleet

Facilities 
The downtown Visalia Transit Center is at 425 E Oak Ave. Additional transfer points exist in the north (near the Orchard Walk shopping center), east (Ben Maddox and E Walnut), south (Sequoia Mall), and west (Visalia Medical Clinic).

References

External links 

Official website

Public transportation in the San Joaquin Valley Area
Transportation in Visalia, California
Bus transportation in California
Public transportation in Tulare County, California
Transit agencies in California